Manduca lanuginosa is a moth of the family Sphingidae first described by Henry Edwards in 1887. It is known from Mexico, Belize, Honduras, Nicaragua, Costa Rica and Venezuela.

The wingspan is 86–104 mm. It is similar in appearance to several other members of the genus Manduca, but a number of differences distinguish it from Manduca florestan, to which it most closely compares, particularly in the smaller head and duller and more uniform colour. Furthermore, the forewing upperside is less whitish grey and the hindwing underside has brown bands that are less well marked.

There is one generation per year in Costa Rica with adults on wing from May to June. They feed on the nectar of various flowers that open at night such as Calliandra marginata.

The larvae feed on Cydista heterophylla, Arrabidaea chica, Arrabidaea molissima, Crescentia alata, Cydista diversifolia, Tabebuia ochracea, Macfadyena unguis-cati, Cornutia grandifolia and Rehdera trinervis.

The larva have diagonal lateral white slashes which continue up onto the back in the form of lines of small black rings with a white centre. There are several colour morphs, with a ground colour ranging from green to yellow green and black purple.

References

Manduca
Moths described in 1887